Aureliano Maestre de San Juan ( October 17, 1828 - June 1, 1890) was a Spanish scientist, histologist, physician and anatomist. He is credited as being one of the first scientists to recognize the disorder known as Kallmann syndrome. He died in 1890, having been blinded in a laboratory accident involving caustic soda two years earlier.

See also 

 Kallmann syndrome

References 

1828 births
1890 deaths
Spanish anatomists
Complutense University of Madrid alumni
19th-century Spanish physicians
19th-century Spanish scientists